Mira Golubović (born 15 October 1976) is a retired volleyball player from Serbia. She played for national team and various clubs in Europe last being Voléro Zürich from Switzerland.

Clubs

Achievements
Domestic championships 
Serbia and Montenegro Championship (4): 1995, 1996, 1997, 1998
Azerbaijani Championship (3): 2011, 2012, 2013
Romanian Championship (2): 1999, 2010
Swiss Championship (2): 2007, 2014
Spanish Championship (1): 2006

Domestic Cups
Serbia and Montenegro Cup (3): 1994, 1996, 1997
Swiss Cup (2): 2007, 2014
Copa de la Reina (1): 2006
Romanian Cup (1): 2010

Domestic Super Cups
Italian Super Cup (1): 1999
Spanish Super Cup (1): 2005
Swiss Super Cup (1): 2006

International
FIVB Volleyball Women's Club World Championship (1): 2011
Champions League (1): 2000

References

External links
 at Volero Zürich website

1976 births
Living people
Sportspeople from Metković
Serbs of Croatia
Serbian women's volleyball players
Serbian expatriate sportspeople in Romania
Serbian expatriate sportspeople in Italy
Serbian expatriate sportspeople in Japan
Serbian expatriate sportspeople in Spain
Serbian expatriate sportspeople in Switzerland
Serbian expatriate sportspeople in Russia
Serbian expatriate sportspeople in Azerbaijan
LGBT volleyball players